Willowbrook is a neighborhood in Staten Island, one of the five boroughs of New York City. It is located in the region of the island usually referred to as Mid-Island, immediately to the south of Port Richmond, to the west of Meiers Corners and Westerleigh, to the north of New Springville, and to the east of Bulls Head.

History
Named for a brook that flowed through the area's farmland, Willowbrook once lay at the heart of the island's agricultural zone, and first saw other significant development when a military hospital opened there during World War II. After the war ended the property became the site of Willowbrook State School, a state-run institution for intellectually disabled children that became the scene of a national scandal in the 1970s when it was revealed that the children housed there were the victims of widespread abuse and neglect. The facility was forced to close by 1987, and six years later a campus of the College of Staten Island opened at the site.  Willowbrook Park, a large city park, borders the college on the west.  It was also home to the Seaview Hospital tuberculosis sanatorium, added to the National Register of Historic Places in 2005.

The neighborhood was also drastically transformed with the opening of the Verrazano-Narrows Bridge in November 1964. Soon after this, the farms were sold and broken up, and residential housing was built on the property. Many of the owners of the newly built homes were Jewish families, and as a result, Willowbrook became the center of the island's Orthodox Jewish community, which from the turn of the 20th century until the late 1960s and early 1970s was primarily  centered in Staten Island's North Shore neighborhood of Tompkinsville along with most of Staten Island's then-small Jewish population.

The 2010s saw a great influx to the Jewish community in Willowbrook, because of the housing crisis in Brooklyn.

Demographics

Young Israel of Staten Island — an Orthodox synagogue that is the island's largest Jewish house of worship — is located in Willowbrook, as are a number of smaller Orthodox congregations, including Hasidic and Sephardic congregations. Although Willowbrook is home to non-Orthodox Jews as well, there are no non-Orthodox synagogues in the community. There are also many Italian-Americans as well as East Asians, African Americans, and South Asians.

Education

School
Willowbrook is the location of P.S. 54, an elementary school administered by the New York City Department of Education.

Library
The New York Public Library (NYPL)'s Todt Hill-Westerleigh branch is located at 2550 Victory Boulevard on the border between Willowbrook and Westerleigh. The three-story branch opened in 1991.

Transportation
Willowbrook is served by the  local buses and the  express buses.

References

External links
Willowbrook Jewish Community Development

Jews and Judaism in Staten Island
Neighborhoods in Staten Island
Robert Moses projects
Orthodox Jewish communities